George Eliphaz Spencer (November 1, 1836 – February 19, 1893) was an American politician and a U.S. senator from the state of Alabama who also served as an officer in the Union Army during the American Civil War.

Biography
Born in Champion, New York, Spencer was the son of Gordon Percival and Deborah Mallory Spencer. He educated at Montreal College in Canada. After relocating to Iowa he engaged in the study of law. During the Pike's Peak Gold Rush he briefly relocated to Colorado where in November 1859 he founded the town of Breckenridge. 
He married English author Bella Zilfa in 1862.

Career
During the American Civil War, Spencer enlisted as a captain on October 16, 1862. While serving on the staff of Brig. Gen. Grenville M. Dodge, he requested a transfer to the 1st Alabama Cavalry Regiment, a volunteer regiment made up of Southern Unionists, which did not have a permanent commander. Receiving a promotion to colonel, he led the regiment from September 11, 1863, until his resignation on July 5, 1865.

After the war, Spencer returned to Alabama to practice law. His wife died of typhoid fever in 1867. For a time he served as register in bankruptcy for the fourth district of Alabama.

Elected as a Republican to the United States Senate upon readmission of Alabama to the Union, Spencer served from July 13, 1868, to March 3, 1879. The Ku Klux Klan and their supporters accused him of corruption and rewarding supporters in the legislature with patronage positions, allegations which he denied.

He was appointed a commissioner of the Union Pacific Railroad with help from his previous leader, Major General Dodge. In 1877, he married prominent actress "May" Nunez, the niece and namesake of one-armed Confederate General William Wing Loring. The couple then spent two years on a ranch in Nevada tending to mining interests before settling in Washington, D.C., about 1880.

Death
Spencer died in Washington, D.C., on February 19, 1893 (age 56 years, 110 days). He is interred at Arlington National Cemetery, Arlington, Virginia.

References

External links

1836 births
1893 deaths
People from Champion, New York
Alabama Republicans
Republican Party United States senators from Alabama
Washington, D.C., Republicans
19th-century American politicians
Union Army colonels